Charles Murray, 1st Earl of Dunmore (1661–1710) was a British peer, previously Lord Charles Murray.

The second son of John Murray, 1st Marquess of Atholl, he rose to become a general in the British Army and was created Earl of Dunmore, Lord Murray of Blair, Moulin and Tillimet (or Tullimet) and Viscount of Fincastle, all in the Peerage of Scotland, in 1686.

Family
Dunmore married Catherine Watts, daughter of Richard Watts, on 8 December 1682, and together they had five sons and three daughters:

Capt. James, Viscount Fincastle (7 Dec 1683 - 29 Sep 1704)
Henrietta Maria (c. 1684 - 27 Oct 1702) married Patrick Kinnaird, 3rd Lord Kinnaird. They had no issue.
General John Murray, 2nd Earl of Dunmore (31 Oct 1685 - 18 Apr 1752)
Brig.-Gen. Hon. Robert Murray (7 Jan 1689 - 9 Mar 1738) married Mary Halkett, daughter of Sir Charles Halkett, 1st Baronet and Janet Murray the granddaughter of both Sir William Murray, 1st Baronet of Dunerne and great granddaughter of William Alexander, 1st Earl of Stirling. They had one known daughter, Catherine.
William Murray, 3rd Earl of Dunmore (2 Mar 1696 - 1 Dec 1756)
Lt.-Gen. Hon. Thomas (June 1698 - 21 Nov 1764) married Elizabeth Arminger, and had one known daughter by her, Frances Maria.
Lady Anne Murray (d. 30 Nov 1710). She married John Campbell Cochrane, 4th Earl of Dundonald. They had three sons, and a daughter, Lady Anne Cochrane (1707-1724) who married James Hamilton, 5th Duke of Hamilton.
Lady Catherine, who married John Murray, Master of Nairne, son of William Murray, 2nd Lord Nairne. They had multiple children, but of three sons who survived infancy only one, John, lived to adulthood. one of John's son was William Murray Nairne, 5th Lord Nairne.

References

Further reading
Kidd, Charles, Williamson, David (editors). Debrett's Peerage and Baronetage (1990 edition). New York: St Martin's Press, 1990

Earls of Dunmore
1661 births
1710 deaths
Charles
Royal Scots Greys officers
Peers of Scotland created by James VII
Younger sons of marquesses